Equatorial Guinea is divided into two regions and eight provinces. The newest province is Djibloho, created in 2017 with its headquarters at Ciudad de la Paz, the country's future capital.

Regions
Insular Region (capital at Malabo)
Río Muni (capital at Bata)

Provinces

Annobón, Bioko Norte and Bioko Sur are in the Insular Region; the other five provinces are in the Continental Region.

Subdivisions

The provinces are further divided into 19 districts and 37 municipalities.

See also

References

 
Subdivisions of Equatorial Guinea
Equatorial Guinea 1
Equatorial Guinea geography-related lists
Equatorial Guinea, Provinces
Provinces, Equatorial Guinea